Golden Hair can refer to:

 Good luck for 20 days
 Golden Hair, a poem by James Joyce that appeared in the collection Chamber Music
 "Golden Hair", a song by Syd Barrett that is based on the original Joyce poem
 "Golden Hair", a story from The Malachite Box book of folk tales
 Golden Hair (album)
 A common name for Chrysocoma cernua, a flowering plant from the Asteraceae family